Return to Paradise is Australian singer-songwriter and producer Sam Sparro's second album. It was released on 1 June 2012. The album entered the Australian Albums Chart, peaking at number 41. In Belgium the album peaked at number 35 on the Belgian (Flanders) Albums Chart, and number 80 in the Netherlands on the Dutch Albums Chart. The album had less success in the United Kingdom, however, failing to chart in the top 200 or to produce any charting singles.

Background
This album has a different sound compared to his previous album. Whereas Sam Sparro was primarily a dance-pop and electropop album, Return to Paradise is influenced by disco, especially '90s house. Sparro again worked with producer and long-time friend Jesse Rogg, who helped to produce almost every track on Sparro's debut album Sam Sparro. Sparro's father, Chris Falson, is cited as having played guitar on the track "Closer". Sparro also worked with Charlie Wilcox on the songs "Happiness" and "We Could Fly", who he had previous worked with on "Still Hungry", the hidden track from his debut album. Sparro's old friend Felix Bloxsom, who he went to school with in Sydney, is featured on drums on multiple tracks from the album, and produced the Plastic Plates Remix of "Shades of Grey", which was later included on Re-Return to Paradise. Sparro worked on a few songs with Jono Sloan. John Fields is responsible for mixing almost all tracks from Return to Paradise. Lester Mendez, who has previously worked with Sparro on the tracks "Shady" and "Broken English" written for Adam Lambert's second album Trespassing, helped write the album's title track "Return to Paradise". Isabella Summers of Florence + the Machine worked on "Shades of Gray". Bethany Cosentino of Best Coast sang backing vocals for and co-wrote "Yellow Orange Rays". The Swedish pop singer-songwriter, Erik Hassle, is one of the writers of the second single, "I Wish I Never Met You". Greg Kurstin and Stuart Zender are also featured writers, producers, and instrumentalists on the album.

Singles

Critical reception

In a review for AllMusic, critic reviewer Matt Collar described the release as a "groove-oriented R&B, immaculately produced with a disco and house music purist's ear for period details." He went on to say, "Sparro imbues each of these songs with an intensity, passion, and palpable love that shines through even when he's singing about heartbreak and negativity." At The Independent, music journalist Simon Price was critical of Return to Paradise noting "the Australian electro-soul auteur's second album is a patchy affair which too often fails to transcend its blatant P-funk influences."

Track listing

Note
(*) denotes co-producer.

Personnel
Credits adapted from the liner notes of Return to Paradise.

 Tyler Andelin Blake – writer
 Felix Bloxsom – drums, remix engineering
 James Bowen – guitar
 Julian Brody – writer, guitar 
 Bethany Cosentino – background vocals
 Michael Brian David – writer
 Jason Disu – trombone
 Chris Falson – guitar
 Sam Falson – vocals, background vocals, writing, production, co-production, strings and horns arranging, tambourine, agogôs, synths, additional synths, additional piano
 John Fields – mixing
 Steve Graeber – saxophone
 Erik Hassle – writing
 Greg Kurstin – additional vocals, writing, production, all instruments
 Justin Elliot Lacher – photography
 Linda McCrary – background vocals, additional vocals
 Lester Mendez – writing, programming, instruments
 Caitlin Moe – violin
 Kristle Murden – background vocals, additional vocals
 Posey MFG – management
 Jesse Rogg – additional vocals, writing, production, post production, programming, additional programming, mixing, synths
 Nick Roseboro – trumpet
 Ryan Shields – percussion
 Jono Sloan – writing, production, co-production, synths, CS-80
 Isabella Summers – writing, harp, synths
 Michelle Tomaszewski – styling
 Dave Wilder – bass
 Charlie Willcocks – writing, rhodes, piano, synths
 Zama Media Management – management
 Jonathan Zawada – design, illustration
 Stuart Zender – writing, bass

Notes
 signifies person as Sparro's father

Charts

Release history

References

2012 albums
Sam Sparro albums
Albums produced by Greg Kurstin